Mariam Hasan Shah (born 19 September 1985) is a Pakistani cricketer who played as a right-arm medium-fast bowler and right-handed batter. She appeared in 3 One Day Internationals and 5 Twenty20 Internationals for Pakistan between 2010 and 2012. She played domestic cricket for Zarai Taraqiati Bank Limited and Omar Associates.

Career 
Mariam Hasan made her One Day International debut against Sri Lanka in  Potchefstroom, South Africa on 10 October 2010. She was selected to play in the 2010 Asian Games in China.

References

External links
 
 

1985 births
Living people
Cricketers from Jhang
Pakistani women cricketers
Pakistan women One Day International cricketers
Pakistan women Twenty20 International cricketers
Zarai Taraqiati Bank Limited women cricketers
Omar Associates women cricketers
Cricketers at the 2010 Asian Games
Asian Games gold medalists for Pakistan
Asian Games medalists in cricket
Medalists at the 2010 Asian Games